Graptopetalum (leatherpetal) is a plant genus of the family Crassulaceae. They are perennial succulent plants and native to Mexico and Arizona. They grow usually in a rosette. There are around 19 species in this genus.

Species
 Graptopetalum amethystinum (Rose) E.Walther –  Lavender pebbles, jewel-leaf plant 
 Graptopetalum bartramii Rose –  Patagonia Mountain leatherpetal, Bartram'sstonecrop 
 Graptopetalum bellum (Moran & Meyran) D.R.Hunt
 Graptopetalum filiferum (S.Watson) Whitehead
 Graptopetalum fruticosum Moran
 Graptopetalum glassii  Acev.-Rosas & Cházaro
 Graptopetalum grande  Alexander
 Graptopetalum macdougallii Alexander
 Graptopetalum marginatum Acev.-Rosas & Cházaro
 Graptopetalum mendozae Glass & M.Cházaro Basáñez
 Graptopetalum occidentale Rose ex E.Walther
 Graptopetalum pachyphyllum Rose
 Graptopetalum paraguayense (N.E.Br.) E.Walther – Mother of pearl plant, ghost plant
Graptopetalum paraguayense subsp. bernalense Kimnach & R.C.Moran
 Graptopetalum pentandrum Moran
 Graptopetalum pusillum Rose
 Graptopetalum rusbyi (Greene) Rose –  San Francisco River leatherpetal 
 Graptopetalum saxifragoides Kimnach
Graptopetalum saxifragoides var. fariniferum Kimnach
 Graptopetalum superbum (Kimnach) Acev.-Rosas

References

External links

 
Succulent plants
Crassulaceae genera